Rose Marie Abdoo (born November 28, 1962) is an American actress and comedian, known for her roles as Stars Hollow's local mechanic, Gypsy, on Gilmore Girls and as Spanish teacher Señorita Rodriguez on That's So Raven.

Life and career
Abdoo was born in Detroit, Michigan. Her father, Peter Abdoo, was a budget analyst for the United States Army Corps of Engineers and her mother, Mary, was a homemaker.

Abdoo's career began in Chicago, where she performed at various improvisational theaters, including the Improv Institute and four years with The Second City; she went on to develop her own one-woman shows, Who Does She Think She Is? and Get to the Part About Me. She also did a short-lived variety program with Bob Odenkirk and Conan O'Brien called Happy Happy Good Show.

After graduating from Southfield High School, Abdoo earned a Bachelor of Arts in Communication in 1984 and later a Master of Fine Arts in Acting, both from Michigan State University. She was cast in several college theater roles and encouraged by a professor to study improvisation. She went on to move to Chicago, where she joined Second City, performing first in their national touring shows and moving on to their E.T.C. troupe. As a part of E.T.C., Abdoo won a Joseph Jefferson Award as "Best Actress in a Revue" in 1991 for her role in the production We Made a Mesopotamia, Now You Clean It Up, playing what the Chicago Tribune called "the show's meatiest part: an obnoxious, know-it-all tour bus rider." She went on to co-host the awards ceremony in 1994.

She was nominated alongside her castmates for a Best Ensemble Screen Actors Guild award for Good Night, and Good Luck.

In March 2008, Abdoo co-starred in the web series The Writers Room on Crackle.

Abdoo joined the cast of HBO Hacks as Josefina in 2021.

Filmography

Films

Television

References

External links
 
 

American women comedians
American television actresses
Living people
20th-century American actresses
21st-century American actresses
American film actresses
Actresses from Chicago
American people of Arab descent
American people of Lebanese descent
American people of Dominican Republic descent
Michigan State University alumni
American stage actresses
Comedians from Illinois
20th-century American comedians
21st-century American comedians
1962 births